is a railway station on the Nagoya Line in Yatomi, Aichi Prefecture, Japan, operated by the private railway operator Kintetsu Railway. Sakogi Station is 13.7 rail kilometers from the terminus of the line at Kintetsu Nagoya Station.

Lines
Kintetsu
Nagoya Line

Station layout
Sakogi Station has two opposed side platforms.

Platforms

Adjacent stations

History
Sagoki Station opened on June 26, 1938 as a station on the Sangu Express Electric Railway. On January 1, 1940, the Sangu Express SakogiRailway and the Kansai Express Electric Railway merged. After merging with Osaka Electric Kido on March 15, 1941, the line became the Kansai Express Railway's Nagoya Line. This line was merged with the Nankai Electric Railway on June 1, 1944 to form Kintetsu.

References

External links
 Kintetsu: Sakogi Station

Railway stations in Japan opened in 1938
Railway stations in Aichi Prefecture
Stations of Kintetsu Railway